The General Presidency of Haramain, is a Saudi government agency responsible for the development and administration of the Islamic holy sites of the Masjid al-Haram and the Masjid an-Nabawi, facilitated by its religious, technical and administrative departments. The agency was founded on 8 May 2012 by a royal decree from King Abdullah of Saudi Arabia. Headquartered in the Masjid al-Haram in Mecca, the agency is overseen by the President who is appointed by royal order.

The incumbent President of the agency is Abdul-Rahman al-Sudais, imam of the Masjid al-Haram, who was appointed the president of the agency the same day it was formed, with his term being renewed twice since by King Salman of Saudi Arabia.

History 
The General Presidency was founded on 8 May 2012 by a royal decree from King Abdullah of Saudi Arabia, who also appointed Abdul-Rahman al-Sudais as its president. He has been re-appointed to the position twice since by King Salman of Saudi Arabia, in 2016 and 2020 as is the current incumbent.

Administration 
The agency oversees several other departments overseeing various other aspects of the two mosques, such as the Kiswah factory. The administration of the Masjid an-Nabawi is carried out by the Agency of the General Presidency of the Affairs of the Prophet's Mosque, an subagency of the General Presidency of Haramain.

The President of the agency is appointed for a 4-year term by the King of Saudi Arabia.

References 

Government agencies of Saudi Arabia
Government agencies established in 2012
2012 establishments in Saudi Arabia